The Missourians were an American jazz band active in the 1920s, who performed at the Cotton Club in New York City and eventually became the backing band for Cab Calloway.

The Missourians were formed by Wilson Robinson in the early 1920s under the name Wilson Robinson's Syncopators, or Wilson Robinson's Bostonians. Andrew Preer took leadership of the group in 1925, which performed at the Cotton Club until 1927 under the name Andrew Preer's Cotton Club Orchestra. In 1927 the group became the accompanying band for Ethel Waters on tour, and changed its name to The Missourians, since Duke Ellington's band had become known as the Cotton Club Orchestra. After returning to New York the band took up residency at the Savoy Ballroom from 1928 to 1929; reedist George Scott was its leader during this period. In 1929, Cab Calloway led the group intermittently, and assumed leadership of the band in 1930; soon after he began recording as Cab Calloway and His Orchestra. Prior to Calloway's arrival, the group recorded for Gennett Records and Victor Records. The group's membership in the 1920s included Lammar Wright Sr., R.Q. Dickerson, Dewey Jackson, William Thornton Blue, David Jones, Earres Prince, and Andrew Brown.

References

Musical groups from Harlem
American jazz ensembles from New York City
Jazz musicians from New York (state)